Priolepis nocturna, the Blackbarred reefgoby, is a species of goby native to the Indian Ocean and the western Pacific Ocean where it occurs at depths of from  on coral reefs.  It inhabits crevices in the reef.  This species can reach a length of  SL.

References

nocturna
Fish described in 1957